Morrill Township is a township in Brown County, Kansas, USA.  As of the 2000 census, its population was 503.

Geography
The airport and eastern fringes of the city of Sabetha are also in Morrill Township. According to the USGS, it contains one cemetery, Dunkard.

The stream of Pedee Creek runs through this township.

References
 USGS Geographic Names Information System (GNIS)

External links
 US-Counties.com
 City-Data.com

Townships in Brown County, Kansas
Townships in Kansas